The North Park Theatre is a historic single screen movie theatre in Buffalo, New York's North Park Neighborhood.  It has functioned as a cinema since it opened on November 21, 1920.

Originally called Shea's North Park, the theatre, along with Shea's Performing Arts Center, serves as a remnant of the now defunct Shea's theatre chain, once owned by early twentieth century businessman Michael Shea.  Its design by Henry Spann was influenced by the neoclassical movement.   The auditorium features a proscenium above the screen and a 5-paneled recessed dome arched into the ceiling, both decorated with murals by Raphael Beck.

The North Park operated under Dipson Theatres until May 2013, when it was purchased by a new ownership group. The theater closed for an eight-month restoration that included returning ornamental features such as the plaster dome and proscenium in the auditorium to their former glory. The theater reopened on March 7, 2014, and screens a mixture of children's, independent, specialty, and occasionally first-run films. In November 2014, a restored stained-glass window above the marquee that had long been hidden behind a concrete panel, was unveiled.

In June 1998, the North Park held the world premiere of Buffalo '66. This marked the first major film to premiere in Buffalo since The Natural opened in 1984. In attendance were Vincent Gallo, Christina Ricci, and Asia Argento. In July 2018, The First Purge, which filmed in 2017 in Buffalo, NY, premiered starring “The City of Buffalo”.

See also 
North Buffalo - neighborhood
Riviera Theatre - historic theatre

References

External links 
North Park Theatre Official Website
History of the North Park Theatre
The North Park Theatre at cinematreasures.org

Theatres completed in 1920
Buildings and structures in Buffalo, New York
Culture of Buffalo, New York
Theatres in New York (state)
1920 establishments in New York (state)
Movie palaces